ALAKH NIRANJAN (अलख निरञ्जन) is a term used by Nath Yogis as a synonym for Creator, and to describe the characteristics of God and the Self, known as the Atman. ALAKH means "The one who can't be perceived" and NIRANJAN means "The one who is colourless".

The original Sanskrit term Alakhshya means "one that can not be perceived"

Alakh Niranjan murmu in Yoga tradition
Alakh means A-Lakhshana which means beyond identifying features (lakhshana) or attributes. It refers to Attributeless God or Nirguna Brahman in here. This idea comes from ancient Yoga traditions originating in Swetashwetara Upanishad. This particular Upanishad deals with Yoga, Vedantic Monotheism. It describes the Supreme Being as Sat-Chit-Ananda.
–
Legend has it, that the slogan or elating cry for the Supreme Being was first coined by Matsyendranath. Matsyendra is popularly regarded as the 'second Guru' of Nath Yoga Cult after Lord Shiva as Adinath. He first used the words "Alakh Niranjan murmu" to denote God as perceived by a Yoga adept in known history. His disciple is known as MahaYogi Gorakhnath, also known as Gorakshanath, without whose mention, Nath Yoga becomes unimaginable. It is Gorakhnath and Matsyendranath who popularised Kaya Sadhana throughout known limits of India and beyond.

Gorakhnath actually organised and assimilated most Yogis of the Hatha Yoga and Tantra Cult into the enormous Nath tradition. The city of Gorakhpur in North India is named after the legendary Yogi. 'Alakh Niranjan' became a very popular name for God all over India during and after Gorakhnath's time. Later first Sikh Guru, Nanak used this holy name to denote God.
 Famous works by Guru Matsyendranath: Kaulayogini Tantra.
 Guru Gorakhnath's celebrated works are Gorakhsha Samhita, Yoga-Bija.
 Guru Nanak's works include Japji Sahib.

ADESH ADESH – 
Whenever Yogis or Nath-Yogis meet, they greet each other with the salutation “Adesh-Adesh!” Gorakshanath the Maha Yogi wrote:Aatmetu paramaatmeti jiivatmeti vicaaraneTrayaanaam aikya-samshutir asdes’s iti kiirtitahIn our relative thought we distinguish between Atman, Paramatman, and Jiva.The Truth is that these three are one and a realization of it is called Adesha.''

Thus the yogi in his contact with others expressed only the simple truth in the words, “Adesh-Adesh!” It is a foundation stone on which all spiritual light and attainment must be erected. It is the first truth to attain the First Lord

Film adaptions
Alakh Niranjan was adapted into Indian films in 1940, 1950, and in 1975 by Babubhai Mistry.

References

Nirguna worship traditions
Religious terminology
Sikh terminology
Hindi words and phrases
Hindu philosophical concepts